The South Carolina State Fair is an annual 12-day state fair held in Columbia, South Carolina and operated by the State Agricultural and Mechanical Society of South Carolina. North American Midway Entertainment caters rides, food, and games for the fair. The fair is South Carolina's largest recurring event, attracting over 400,000 fairgoers annually.

History 
As early as the 1720s, agricultural fairs held in the South Carolina lowcountry were the forerunners of today's South Carolina State Fair.  During the early nineteenth century, local and regional agricultural societies sponsored fairs featuring competitive events with prizes for the best crops, livestock and homemaking skills. In 1839, the State Agricultural Society was organized to establish a statewide fair, and state fairs were held in Columbia from 1841 to 1845 and again from 1856 to 1861.  

In 1869, the State Agricultural and Mechanical Society of South Carolina was created to sponsor a state fair.  Held on the pre-war state fair grounds on Elmwood Avenue on property provided by the city of Columbia, the revived State Fair not only promoted the agricultural interests of the state, but it also recognized the need to encourage industrial development. Every year since 1869, except for 1918 when the influenza epidemic was raging across the nation, the Society has sponsored a state fair. By 1903, the fair outgrew the Elmwood Avenue location, and in 1904 the annual fair moved to its present location on Rosewood Avenue (presently, Rosewood Drive).

From its founding in 1869, the State Fair has been an important economic contributor to the local economy. Beginning in the 1870s, the carnival component of the fair was held on Columbia's downtown streets, flooding the area each evening with thousands of visitors enjoying the restaurants and retail stores, of all which stayed open each night. Each winter from the 1890's until 1969 the fairgrounds provided winter quarters for hundreds of racehorses and their support personnel from northern racetracks. Even before the annual football contest between South Carolina and Clemson began in earnest in 1909, "Big Thursday" was the peak day of fair week, culminating with the State Ball on Thursday evening. By the middle of the 20th century, Thursday of fair week was a state holiday centered-around the football game. The last Carolina/Clemson "Big Thursday" game was in 1959.  

Most state fairs did not operate every year during World War II, but the South Carolina State Fair was open every year during the war. From 1909 to 1969 the week following the South Carolina State Fair the fairgrounds were used by the Colored State Fair Association to host a state fair for the African American community. 

In many ways the South Carolina State Fair is a typical state fair, but it also has had its unique characteristics. While it is the official state fair, it is not connected in any way with the state government but is a private non-profit organization with a self-perpetuating governing board. The mission of the non-profit is to help educate the youth of South Carolina.  The South Carolina State Fair has awarded more than $4 million in scholarships since 1997. 

Since its conception, the State Fair has not only promoted agriculture and industry, but it has also reflected the culture and mores of the state. The essence of the State Fair was captured in an editorial in The State newspaper on October 18, 1960: "The South Carolina State Fair may mean different things to different people… In a very real sense it is the opportunity to take stock within our state as to where we stand in agriculture and industry, in science and art and history. It is foremost the reflection of our educational values and where we put our faith."

Bands and singers that have played in the Grandstand include Chicago in 1970, Golden Earring (from the Netherlands) in '74, Billy Ray Cyrus in 1995, Little Richard
(from Macon) in '98, Jars of Clay in 2000, Beach Boys in 2001, Columbia's own Hootie & the Blowfish in 2001, Daughtry (from Greensboro) in 2007, Jonas Brothers in 2007, American Idol winner David Cook in '09, USC alumni Darius Rucker in 2010, Eric Church (from NC) in '10, Miranda Lambert in '10, Avett Brothers (from Charlotte) in 2010, Styx in 2011, Skillet in 2011, O.A.R. in 2012, Doobie Brothers in 2012, Boyz II Men in 2012, Hunter Hayes in '13, Foreigner in '13, Corey Smith (from Georgia) in 2013, Marshall Tucker Band (from Spartanburg) in 2014, Charleston's Shovels & Rope in '14, MC Hammer in 2014, Shawn Mendes (from Canada) in 2015, Lynyrd Skynyrd (from Jacksonville) in 2016, Alabama in '16, Chris Young (from the Nashville area) in 2017, Bret Michaels of Poison in 2018, The Temptations with The Four Tops, Trace Adkins, Scotty McCreery (from Raleigh), and Irmo's Tokyo Joe band doing a tribute to Elton John in 2018. Charleston's Jump, Little Children played there for the relocated 2019 Rosewood Crawfish Festival. The South Carolina State Fair ended its Grand Stand entertainment after 2018.  Starting in 2019, in the place of the Grand Stand is a Circus Tent that offers three free circus shows each day of the fair.

Located on the South Carolina State Fairgrounds, at the north entrance, is the "Rocket".  This "Rocket" is a Jupiter intermediate range ballistic missile, designed by Dr. Wernher von Braun and built by Chrysler.  Its name is Columbia, and it was given to the city in the early 1960's by the U.S. Air Force.  In 1969, the "Rocket" was erected at the South Carolina State Fairgrounds at a cost of $10,000.  Through the years, the landmark has become a popular meeting place for guests, which has resulted in the popular phrase, "Meet me at the Rocket!"  

Due to the COVID-19 pandemic the South Carolina State Fair scheduled for October 14–25, 2020 was replaced by a free drive-though only event held on October, 20–21. In 2021, the fair returned to the more traditional experience.
The next South Carolina State Fair is 12-23 October 2022.

References 

Meet Me at the Rocket: A History of the South Carolina State Fair
Written by Rodger E. Stroup

External links 
 History of the SC State Fair
 

October events
South Carolina articles needing attention
State fairs
Tourist attractions in Columbia, South Carolina
Festivals established in 1869
1869 establishments in South Carolina